Bandel Vidyamandir is a Higher Secondary School in Bandel, West Bengal, India.

History
The school was established in 1953.

Campus
The campus is located at Ambagan Railway Colony in Bandel-712123, near Bandel Junction railway station.

Academics
The school provides section in  Arts, Science and Commerce streams. The school is affiliated to the West Bengal Board of Secondary Education (for the Secondary Education) and to the WBCHSE (for HS).

High schools and secondary schools in West Bengal
Schools in Hooghly district
Educational institutions established in 1953
1953 establishments in West Bengal